360 Secure Browser (360 Security Browser) or 360 Safe Browser is a web browser developed by the Qihoo company of Beijing, China. It was first released in September 2008.

The browser by default renders the webpage using the WebKit-based engine adapted for Google Chrome, Blink, and when running in compatibility mode, it renders webpages using the Trident engine found in Internet Explorer.

World version 
In early 2014 Qihoo released a global version of its web browser.

360 (Speed) Extreme Browser (Explorer) version 
Besides 360 Secure Browser, there is another version titled 360 Extreme Browser (360 Extreme Explorer).

Market share 

In January 2011, Qihoo claimed that it was the second most popular web browser in China (after Internet Explorer), with 172 million monthly active users, 44.1% of Internet users in China. Independent sources claim that the true figure is between 2-7%. In November 2014 StatCounter reported that the Qihoo browser was the 5th most popular browser in the United States. Its main competitors in China are the Sogou High-Speed Browser by Sogou, CM Browser by Cheetah Mobile, QQ Browser by Tencent, Baidu Browser by Baidu and Maxthon.

, the latest versions of 360 Secure Browser do not offer a distinguishable user-agent string. It spoofs itself either as Google Chrome or Internet Explorer, making it difficult for developers to target or identify.

Controversies 

In 2012, a whistleblower reported a hidden backdoor in 360 Secure Browser. The Product Director of 360 Secure Browser, Tao Weihua, responded that "Whoever has a mind to beat a dog will always be able to find a stick" and accused the whistleblower of "smearing 360 on behalf of Baidu", which the whistleblower said was "the worst professional response in history". Independent analysis of the claim showed that the browser has an "undeclared mechanism (i.e., via ExtSmartWiz.dll) which connects to the server on a regular basis (e.g., every 5 minutes), and allows it to download files of any type (including executables) from the server."

This and other controversies surrounding Qihoo eventually led to the temporary pulling of their products from the iOS App Store.

High usage numbers may be due to the browser being difficult to uninstall, its parent product 360 Safeguard frequently recommending it and a warning pop-up that appears when a user attempts to install another browser, claiming that the other browser is unsafe and should not be run.

See also
360 Safeguard

References

External links 
 

Windows web browsers
Web browsers
Chinese brands